Carlos André Paulino de Oliveira, known as Carlos André (born 28 November 1971) is a Portuguese football coach and a former player.

Club career
He made his Primeira Liga debut for Estoril on 15 March 1992 in a game against Salgueiros.

Honours
Beira-Mar
Taça de Portugal: 1998–99

References

External links
 

1971 births
Footballers from Lisbon
Living people
Portuguese footballers
G.D. Estoril Praia players
Primeira Liga players
S.C. Beira-Mar players
Liga Portugal 2 players
F.C. Penafiel players
Gil Vicente F.C. players
Vitória S.C. players
Walsall F.C. players
Portuguese expatriate footballers
Expatriate footballers in England
S.C. Braga players
F.C. Maia players
Rot Weiss Ahlen players
Expatriate footballers in Germany
FC Unirea Urziceni players
Expatriate footballers in Romania
A.D. Sanjoanense players
Portuguese football managers
Association football midfielders